

Torneo Apertura ("Opening" Tournament)

Top scorers

Relegation

There is no relegation after the Apertura. For the relegation results of this tournament see below

Torneo Clausura ("Closing" Tournament)

Top scorers

Relegation

"Promoción" Playoff

Lanús wins 3-2 and stays in Argentine First Division.
Huracán de Tres Arroyos remains in Argentine Nacional B.

Unión de Santa Fe wins 4-3 and stays in Argentine First Division.
Gimnasia (CdU) remains in Argentine Nacional B.

Lower leagues

Argentine clubs in international competitions

National team
This section covers Argentina's matches from August 1, 2001 to July 31, 2002.

Friendly matches

2002 World Cup qualifiers

2002 World Cup

References
Argentina 2001-2002 by Javier Romiser at rsssf.
Topscorers Apertura 2001
Topscorers  Clausura 2002

 

es:Torneo Clausura 2002 (Argentina)
it:Campionato di calcio argentino 2001-2002
pl:I liga argentyńska w piłce nożnej (2001/2002)